Kenneth R. Mackenzie (1908–1990), British scholar and parliamentary clerk.

He was educated at Dulwich College and New College, Oxford. He was appointed Clerk to the House of Commons in 1930 and then Clerk to the Select Committee in the 1945-6 session, before becoming the Clerk of Public Bills until his retirement. He was the author of The English Parliament (ed. Pelican, 1950), a guide to the Palace of Westminster, and made translations of Słowacki's In Switzerland, Adam Mickiewicz's epic poem Pan Tadeusz, Dante Alighieri's Divine Comedy, and The Georgics.

References

1908 births
1990 deaths
Clerks of the House of Commons
Alumni of New College, Oxford
20th-century British translators